Twenty One Pilots is the debut studio album by American band Twenty One Pilots, released independently on December 29, 2009. The album sold 115,000 copies and peaked at number 139 on the U.S. Billboard 200 on January 13, 2017.

Background and production 
Sometime after the release of the record, it was revealed that the album was conceptualized and recorded within the homemade recording studio in the basement of the house that Tyler Joseph, Nick Thomas, Chris Salih, and Thomas's brother were staying in at the time. Additionally, while input was provided from the other members of the band, the lyrics were mainly written by Joseph.

The album cover art was designed by John Rettstatt, a friend of Joseph.

Reception 
Despite ranking as the lowest of the band's albums in a list for Kerrang!, Emily Carter considered that "the quality of the songwriting here is already superb", praising Joseph's lyrics, and concluded that "these aren't chart-topping bangers, sure, but the impact of these songs cannot be understated". Maria Sherman of Fuse praised Joseph's "speak-singing" and the "beautiful piano arrangements" on the album, though criticized his enunciation while rapping. Alternative Press described "Addict with a Pen" as "slow, spare, and nakedly honest" and "the best representation of what initially drew fans to the band".

Track listing

Personnel 
 Tyler Joseph – vocals, organs, piano, keyboards, programming, synthesizers, production (all tracks)
 Nick Thomas – guitars, bass, synth bass, programming (all tracks), backing vocals (tracks 9 and 10)
 Chris Salih – drums, percussion, (not recorded on the album) backing vocals (tracks 9 and 10)

Charts

References

2009 debut albums
Twenty One Pilots albums
Emo albums by American artists
Albums recorded in a home studio
Self-released albums